Obelya Metro Station is a station on the Sofia Metro in Bulgaria.  It opened on 20 April 2003. On this station M2 line trains from Vitosha Metro Station continue operation as M4 line trains towards Sofia Airport.

Interchange with other public transport
 Tramway service: 6
 City Bus service: 87
 Suburban Bus service: 26, 30, 31, 81, 150

Location

External links

 Sofia Metropolitan (Official site)
 360 degree panorama from outside the station (north end)

Sofia Metro stations
Railway stations opened in 2003
2003 establishments in Bulgaria